Bakhodir Odimdjonovich Nasimov (born 2 May 1987) is an Uzbek footballer who plays for FC Sogdiana Jizzakh as a forward.

Career

Club

FK Dinamo Samarqand
Nasimov began his career with Dinamo Samarqand and made his senior debut during the 2007 Uzbek League season. During his time with Dinamo, he scored 22 league goals in 58 appearances and spent time on loan with Bunyodkor in 2009, scoring twice in 16 matches.

Neftchi Baku
In 2010 Nasimov was transferred to Russian Premier League champions Rubin Kazan for an undisclosed fee, on a three-year contract. He made two league appearances for Rubin before joining Azerbaijan Premier League club Neftchi Baku on loan for the duration of the 2010–11 season.

Nasimov scored 15 league goals during the campaign to help Neftchi be crowned champions of Azerbaijan for the sixth time. In 2011–12 season Nasimov became Top scorer of Azerbaijan Premier League with 16 goals and made significant contribution to 7th champion title of Neftchi Baku.

On 3 August 2013, in the first matchday of 2013–14 Azerbaijan Premier League Neftchi against AZAL, Nasimov scored his first goal in the new season and first goal after his injury. He scored his 32nd goal for Neftchi Baku and became the best foreign top scoring forward of the club.

Padideh
On 31 October 2014, Nasimov was confirmed as a new signing for Iranian Pro League side Padideh.

Keşla
On 10 July 2018, Nasimov signed a one-year contract with Keşla FK.

Navbahor Namangan
Nasimov joined Navbahor Namangan for the 2019 season.

International
Nasimov made his debut for Uzbekistan in a 2011 Asian Cup qualifier against Malaysia on 18 November 2009 and scored the second goal in a 3–1 win. In his fourth appearance, Nasimov came on as a substitute to score twice in a 3–0 victory against Kyrgyzstan on 28 July 2011 to progress to the third round of qualifying for the 2014 FIFA World Cup.

Career statistics

Club

International goals
Scores and results list Uzbekistan's goal tally first.

Honours

Club
 Neftchi Baku
Azerbaijan Premier League
Winner (2): 2010–11, 2011–12, 2012–13
Azerbaijan Cup
Winner (2): 2012–13, 2013–14

Individual
 Azerbaijan Premier League Top Scorer: 2011–12 (16 goals)

References

External links
 Player information and statistics at uzfootball.uz 

1987 births
Living people
Sportspeople from Tashkent
Uzbekistani footballers
Uzbekistani expatriate footballers
Uzbekistan international footballers
Association football forwards
FC Bunyodkor players
FC Rubin Kazan players
Shamakhi FK players
FK Dinamo Samarqand players
Ansan Greeners FC players
Neftçi PFK players
Shahr Khodro F.C. players
PFK Nurafshon players
Navbahor Namangan players
FC Sogdiana Jizzakh players
Russian Premier League players
Persian Gulf Pro League players
Azerbaijan Premier League players
Uzbekistan Super League players
K League 2 players
2015 AFC Asian Cup players
Uzbekistani expatriate sportspeople in Azerbaijan
Uzbekistani expatriate sportspeople in Russia
Uzbekistani expatriate sportspeople in South Korea
Uzbekistani expatriate sportspeople in Iran
Expatriate footballers in Azerbaijan
Expatriate footballers in Russia
Expatriate footballers in South Korea
Expatriate footballers in Iran